Lot 10 is a shopping mall in Bukit Bintang, Kuala Lumpur, Malaysia. It opened in 1990, and houses tenants such as H&M and Isetan.

Transportation

The mall is accessible from the  Bukit Bintang Monorail station of the KL Monorail, as well as the  Bukit Bintang MRT station.

References

External links 

Virtual Malaysia article
Asia Travel article

Shopping malls established in 1990
Shopping malls in Kuala Lumpur
1990 establishments in Malaysia